Lea Bridge also known as Clapton Saints were a British speedway team that existed from 1928 to 1938. They raced at the Lea Bridge Stadium.

Brief history
They first competed in the Southern League in 1929 and were based at Lea Bridge Stadium, Walthamstow, London
 When they entered the National League in 1932, they took over the fixtures from Southampton, halfway through the National Association Trophy and taking the name of Clapton Saints. In 1934, the team reverted to the name Lea Bridge but once again were unable to fulfill their fixtures, which were completed by Walthamstow Wolves.

The team re-appeared during the 1938 Speedway National League Division Two, under the name of Lea Bridge Cubs, which would be their last season in existence.

Notable riders
Billy Dallison
Max Grosskreutz
Dusty Haigh
Jim Kempster

Season summary

References

Defunct British speedway teams